Pincus Jacob Wolfson (May 22, 1903 in New York – April 16, 1979 in Woodland Hills, Los Angeles) was an American pharmacist, novelist, screenwriter, film producer, and film director.

Early life
Pincus Jacob Wolfson was born to Russian-Jewish immigrants in New York City. His father worked as a plumber. Pincus studied pharmacy at Fordham University.

Career
While working in a pharmacy in Madison Square Garden, he wrote his first novels.

Wolfson published his first novel, Bodies Are Dust, in 1931, and later, published twice, under two different titles, in French. It was called a "masterpiece" by Jean-Patrick Manchette.

Allen Rivkin, an advertising copy writer, who  went to Hollywood and joined the RKO Pictures publicity department, formed a film writing team with Wolfson, who got a writer’s contract on the strength of "Bodies Are Dust". They started at Universal Pictures the same day. Through a luncheon conversation that day decided to collaborate on a story. In less than two years the pair wrote ten screen plays. They later wrote for the B. P. Schulberg company at Paramount Pictures.

He worked for Metro-Goldwyn-Mayer, RKO Pictures, Columbia Pictures, Paramount Pictures. He wrote numerous scripts for film and television. He produced 30 episodes of the television series I Married Joan between 1952 and 1955.

Works
Novels
Bodies Are Dust (1931)
Summer Hotel (1932)
All Women Die (1933)
My Flesh of Brass (1934)
How Sharp the Point (1959)

Partial filmography
Writer
1933 : Picture Snatcher by Lloyd Bacon with James Cagney
1933 : The Tourbillon Dance by Robert Z. Leonard with Joan Crawford and Clark Gable
1935 : Reckless Youth by Victor Fleming with Jean Harlow and William Powell
1935 : The Mad Love of Hands by Karl Freund with Peter Lorre and Frances Drake
1936 : Carolyn wants to Divorce by Leigh Jason with Barbara Stanwyck, Gene Raymond and Robert Young
1937 : The Enterprising Mr. Petrov by Mark Sandrich with Fred Astaire and Ginger Rogers
1937 : Sea Devils by Benjamin Stoloff with Victor McLaglen and Preston Foster
1938 : Marriage Incognito by George Stevens with Ginger Rogers and James Stewart
1939 : Allegheny Uprising by William A. Seiter with Claire Trevor and John Wayne
1940 : Vigil in the Night by George Stevens with Carole Lombard and Brian Aherne
1940 : He Stayed for Breakfast by Alexander Hall with Loretta Young and Melvyn Douglas
1941 : Our Wife by John M. Stahl with Melvyn Douglas, Ruth Hussey and Ellen Drew
1942 : Embrace the Bride by Alexander Hall with Joan Crawford and Melvyn Douglas
1947 : Suddenly, It's Spring by Mitchell Leisen with Paulette Goddard and Fred MacMurray
1947 : The Exploits of Pearl White by George Marshall with Betty Hutton and John Lund
1948 : Saigon by Leslie Fenton with Alan Ladd and Veronica Lake

Director
1939 : Boy Slaves with Anne Shirley

Producer
1938 : The Mad Miss Manton by Leigh Jason with Barbara Stanwyck and Henry Fonda
1939 : Boy Slaves
1939 : Allegheny Uprising by William A. Seiter with Claire Trevor and John Wayne
1943 : My Kingdom for a Cook by Richard Wallace with Charles Coburn, Marguerite Chapman, and Bill Carter.
1948 : Saigon by Leslie Fenton with Alan Ladd and Veronica Lake

Further reading

Citations

External links

 

20th-century American novelists
American crime fiction writers
American people of Russian-Jewish descent
Jewish American novelists
Screenwriters from New York (state)
American producers
Novelists from New York (state)
1903 births
1979 deaths
20th-century American screenwriters
20th-century American Jews